The tricarinate hill turtle or three-keeled land turtle (Melanochelys tricarinata) is a species of turtle found in northeastern India, Bangladesh, and Nepal.

References

Further reading
Blyth E (1856). "Report on the collections presented by Capt. Berdmore and Mr. Theobald". J. Asiatic Soc. Bengal 24 (7): 713–720. (Geomyda tricarinata, new species, p. 714).
Boulenger GA (1890). The Fauna of British India, Including Ceylon and Burma: Reptilia and Batrachia. London: Secretary of State for India in Council. (Taylor and Francis, printers). xviii + 541 pp. (Nicoria tricarinata, p. 28).
Busack, Stephen D. (1994). "Melanochelys tricarinata (Tricarinate hill turtle). India: Uttar Pradesh". Herpetological Review 25 (1): 32.
Das I (2002). A Photographic Guide to Snakes and other Reptiles of India. Sanibel Island, Florida: Ralph Curtis Books. 144 pp. . (Melanochelys tricarinata, p. 127).
Smith MA (1931). The Fauna of British India, Including Ceylon and Burma. Reptilia and Amphibia. Vol. I.—Loricata, Testudines. London: Secretary of State for India in Council. (Taylor and Francis, printers). xxviii + 185 pp. + Plates I-II. (Geoemyda tricarinata, pp. 95–96 + Plate II, figure 1).

Reptiles of India
Melanochelys
Reptiles described in 1856
Taxa named by Edward Blyth